Aynsley China Ltd. was a British manufacturer of bone china tableware, giftware and commemorative items.

History 
The company was founded in 1775 by John Aynsley in Lane End, Longton, Staffordshire. In 1861 his grandson John Aynsley built the historic Portland Works on Sutherland Road, Longton, Staffordshire. The company's profitability made it a desirable acquisition. In June 1970 Spode put in a bid, this was then topped in July by Denbyware. Discussions then followed with Waterford Glass and a £1 million bid was agreed. In 1970 John Aynsley and Sons was taken over by Waterford and renamed Aynsley China Ltd. In 1987 Waterford sold the company in order to focus the group's fine china sales on the worldwide Wedgwood brand.

In May 1997, Aynsley China was acquired by The Belleek Pottery Group in Ireland. The company closed its Stoke-on-Trent factory in September 2014. As of July 2015 the factory shop is still open but its future is uncertain as the site is being advertised as for sale.

Products
The company was a favoured supplier of the British royal family. Both Queen Elizabeth II and Diana, Princess of Wales, chose Aynsley china as wedding presents from the British china industry.

Aynsley's market has historically been within the United Kingdom.

References

Bibliography

External links

 Belleek webpage for Aynsley
 http://www.thepotteries.org/allpotters/29b.htm
 http://www.luxurydining.co.uk/aynsley-222-c.asp

Staffordshire pottery
Companies based in Stoke-on-Trent
Ceramics manufacturers of England
British companies established in 1775
1775 establishments in England